Phoenix High School is a public high school in the Whitfield County School District, located in unincorporated Whitfield County, Georgia, United States. The site has a Dalton postal address.

References

External links
Phoenix High School

Public high schools in Georgia (U.S. state)
Schools in Whitfield County, Georgia